Reed's School is an independent secondary boarding school for boys with a mixed sixth form located in Cobham, Surrey, England. There are currently around 700 day pupils (620 boys, 80 girls) and 100 full-time boarders (80 boys, 20 girls). The school was founded in 1813, by Andrew Reed and incorporated by Act of Parliament in 1845 under the presidency of the Archbishop of Canterbury, the Duke of Wellington and the Marquess of Salisbury.  From 1951 until her death in 2022 Queen Elizabeth II acted as the school's 15th patron and visited the school twice, in 1997 and in 2014, as the reigning monarch. Alumni of the school are known as 'Old Reedonians'.

History

Founding

A notable early sponsor was the Duke of Wellington, a future Prime Minister of the United Kingdom.

London Orphan Asylum, London (1813-1871)
The foundation was established to provide relief to destitute orphans, including children whose fathers had died and whose mothers were unable to provide for them. Initially the Asylum used two houses; one at Hackney Road, Shoreditch for the boys and one in Bethnal Green for the girls. The asylum's first unified site was at Lower Clapton Road, Clapton, where Newcome's School had stood.

There were 206 pupils in 1826 and 453 in the 1860s. During the asylum's time in East London, it was famous for having had some 2000 hymns written for it by the English architect James Edmeston, a strong supporter of and frequent visitor to the London Orphan Asylum.

Following the school's 1871 move to Watford, the East London buildings were used by the Salvation Army. Only the facade of the classical-style building remains, and forms part of the Clapton Girls' Academy

London Orphan Asylum/School, Watford (1871-1939)

) for the new school. The Prince of Wales, later Edward VII, and his wife the Princess of Wales and future Queen Alexandra, laid down the foundational stones on 15 July 1869 and the school  formally opened in 1871.

The school was renamed to the "London Orphan School" in 1915, following a merge with the recently closed Royal British Orphan School in Slough it was again renamed the "London Orphan School and Royal British Orphan School", before finally being named "Reed's School" in 1939, in honour of the late founder.

In the early 1880s the London Orphan Asylum lost two football matches against the then named Watford Rovers, now known as Watford F.C.

Headmasters at the Watford site included Oliver Carter Cockrem and H.W. Russell.

In the 1980s the buildings were converted into residential accommodation.

Reed's School, Totnes & Towcester (1939-1945)

During World War II the school was evacuated from Watford. The site was used as an Army hospital and then by the Ministry of Labour.

Reed's School, Cobham (1945–present)

The Sandy Lane site had been purpose-built for the Sandyroyd School in around 1905 by architects Treadwell and Martin, who were also responsible for the design of Scott's restaurant (now part of the Trocadero Centre) and other notable structures. The new site provided facilities including a heated indoor swimming pool, a nine-hole golf course, and two squash courts.

A new headmaster, Robert Drayson, was appointed in 1955 and remained until 1964, when he migrated to Stowe.

, while retaining its charitable element.

Royal Patrons since 1815
The school has had many royal patrons.
1815    Prince Edward, Duke of Kent and Strathearn
1817    Prince Augustus Frederick, Duke of Sussex
1819    Princess Victoria of Saxe-Coburg-Saalfeld
1819    Leopold I of Belgium
1821    Ernest Augustus, King of Hanover
1822    Prince Frederick, Duke of York and Albany
1823    George IV
1826    Prince Adolphus, Duke of Cambridge
1826    William IV
1837    Queen Victoria
1843    Prince Albert of Saxe-Coburg and Gotha
1856    The Prince of Wales, later Edward VII
1870    The Princess of Wales, later Queen Alexandra
1910    George V
1936    George VI
1951-2022    Elizabeth II

Sports
The major sports at Reed's School are rugby, hockey and cricket with academies in tennis, skiing  and golf. The senior pupils (13+) play rugby, hockey and cricket in the autumn, spring and summer terms respectively. Pupils in the junior school (11–13) play hockey, rugby and then cricket. The indoor tennis centre was opened by alumnus and former British number one, Tim Henman on 18 November 2014. 
The foundation stone for the 25 metre, five lane indoor swimming pool was laid by Duncan Goodhew on 15 November 1990.

Reed's has won the International School Sport Federation's world schools' tennis championship more than any other team (in 2009, 2011 and 2015).

Headmasters
 
 Robert Heath, (1826–1852)
 Henry Beattie, (1852–1869)
 A. F. Houliston (1869–??)
 W. F. Jones
 H. W. Bussell (1878–1886)
 A. R. Clemens (1886–1887)
 Dr. Oliver Carter Cockrem (1887–1915)
 E. Hartley Parker (1915–1921)
 John J. Jackson (1921–1924)
 G. K. Allen (1924–1931)
 C. R. Attenborough (1931–45)
 H. E. D. Axton (1945–1954)
Philip Scott, acting (1954–1955)
 Robert Drayson (1955–1964)
 Rodney Exton (1964–1977) – Hampshire cricketer and schoolmaster
John Baird Tyson (1978–1982) – mountaineer and teacher
 David Prince (1983–1997)
 David Jarrett (1997–2014) – the first person to win a cricket blue for both Oxford and Cambridge
 Mark Hoskins (2014–present)

Notable staff and associated people

James Edmeston, architect and prolific hymn writer; wrote "Lead us, heavenly Father, lead us" for the children of the London Orphan Asylum
 Sir Benjamin Louis Cohen, former President of the London Orphan Asylum
 Sir William Blizard, consulting surgeon to the London Orphan Asylum
Brett Garrard, hockey coach
Richard Gilliat, former head of admissions and Hampshire cricketer, retired in 2017
Keith Medlycott, cricket coach
Tom Hardy, actor

Notable Old Reedonians

Royalty
Prince Zeid Raad of Jordan, UN High Commissioner for Human Rights
Prince Mired Raad of Jordan

Business

Alan Bott, founder of Pan Books
Sir Simon Robey, banker and co-founder of Robey Warshaw

Literature

Thomas Burke
Richard Dinnick, screenwriter and author

Sport

Henrik Breimyr, Norwegian professional football player 
Jeffrey Bruma, professional footballer, currently playing for PSV Eindhoven
Alex Corbisiero, rugby player for Northampton Saints, England and the British and Irish Lions
Jamie Delgado, British tennis player and coach 
Daniel Douthwaite, British cricketer
Jack Draper, British tennis player
Chris Eaton, British tennis player
Alastair Gray, British tennis player 
Evan Hoyt, British tennis player
Jack Gower, British alpine ski racer
Tim Henman, British tennis player
Oskar Kolk, cricketer
James Morrison, golfer
Luke Steyn, ski racer 
Theo Vukašinović, rugby player
Jack Kenningham, rugby player

Arts/entertainment

Richard Bagguley, muralist and artist
Marcel Grant, filmmaker
Dr. Keith Scholey, nature documentary producer 
Elvi Hale, actress
Tom Hardy, actor
Sir Simon Keenlyside, opera singer
Nigel Mitchell, television and radio presenter
Sir Nolan, music producer and songwriter 
Shaun Scott, actor 
Renton Skinner, actor and comedian
Toby Tarrant, radio DJ and son of Chris
Jamie Treays, aka Jamie T, singer-songwriter

Politics

Edward Kellett-Bowman, Conservative Member of the European Parliament

Law
Stuart Popham, British lawyer

Architecture
Mark Fenwick, founder, Fenwick Iribarren. Architects of three of the eight new stadia at World Cup 2022 in Qatar, including Stadium 974.

References

External links 
 Reed's School website

Boys' schools in Surrey
Private schools in Surrey
Member schools of the Headmasters' and Headmistresses' Conference
Boarding schools in Surrey
Educational institutions established in 1813
Relocated schools
1813 establishments in England